Richard J. Crampton is a British professor emeritus of History.

Biography 
He was born on 23 November 1940. Crampton studied at the University of Dublin, gained B.A. at the University of Oxford; M.A. at the University of London; Ph.D. at the University of Kent at Canterbury. He was lecturer, (1967–78); senior lecturer, (1978-88); professor of East European history, (1988–90) at the University of Oxford, lecturer in history, (1990-1996), Fellow of St. Edmund Hall Oxford, 1990—, professor of East European history, (1996—2017). Crampton's writing has focused on Bulgarian and the Balkan history. With his writings about Bulgaria,  Crampton has created important English-language resources on Balkan history. While Crampton has a special interest in East European history, his histories of Bulgaria are especially useful. His works also research the recent history of the Balkan states.

Publications 
 The Hollow Détente: Anglo-German Relations in the Balkans, 1911–1914, Humanities Press (Atlantic Highlands, NJ), 1981.
 Bulgaria, 1878–1918: A History, East European Monographs (New York, NY), 1983.
 
 (Compiler) Bulgaria (bibliography), Clio (Santa Barbara, CA), 1989.
 Eastern Europe in the Twentieth Century, Routledge (New York, NY), 1994, 2nd edition published as 
 (With Benjamin Crampton) Atlas of Eastern Europe in the Twentieth Century, Routledge (New York, NY), 1996.
 
 The Balkans since the Second World War, Longman (New York, NY), 2002.

Notes

External links
  Encyclopedia.com. Crampton, R(Ichard) J. 1940-.

British historians
Fellows of St Edmund Hall, Oxford
1940 births
Living people
Alumni of the University of Oxford
Alumni of the University of London
Alumni of the University of Kent